Braggin' Rights (known for sponsorship reasons as McBride Homes Braggin' Rights, previously Busch Braggin' Rights) is the annual men's college basketball contest between the University of Illinois Fighting Illini of the Big Ten Conference and University of Missouri Tigers of the SEC.

History

First played in 1980, the game takes place in St. Louis, Missouri, during the month of December. From 1980 to 1993, it was played at the St. Louis Arena, and since 1994, it has been played at Enterprise Center. St. Louis is within convenient driving distance of the two schools' home cities of Columbia, Missouri (2 hours), and Champaign, Illinois (2 hours); many students at both schools come from the area; both schools have a large alumni base in greater St. Louis; and the Enterprise Center has a larger capacity than either school's home arena (State Farm Center for Illinois and Mizzou Arena for Missouri). It is traditionally held over the students' holiday break near the end of December and is nationally televised. One of the most closely contested games in the series was the final game held at the St. Louis Arena on December 22, 1993. Missouri defeated Illinois 108-107 in a game that lasted three overtimes.

Before 2000, the series was fairly evenly matched, with Illinois leading the series 11-8 before the game held in 2000. However, the Illini went on a decade-long winning streak under Bill Self and Bruce Weber, while at the same time Missouri basketball floundered with Quin Snyder as coach. Tiger fan frustration with not being able to win one of their marquee games boiled over so much that in Snyder's final game, an 82-50 drubbing in 2005, one fan threw a full tub of popcorn on him while he was exiting the arena. Since hiring Mike Anderson in 2006, though, Missouri's fortunes took an upward turn, culminating in an emphatic win in 2009 with the Enterprise Center playing Prince's "1999" following the victory, as a sly reference to the last time Missouri had won in St. Louis.

The game was not played in 1982, but has been played every year since 1983. The name of the victorious team is engraved on a large trophy that, unlike other college rivalry trophies, does not travel home with the winning team. The trophy is displayed in a glass case in the Enterprise Center lobby, where it occupies either an orange-and-blue or black-and-gold space in the cabinet, depending on who won. The other side has a plastic square reading "THE TROPHY BELONGS HERE NEXT YEAR" in the position where the trophy would go.

Before 1980, the Tigers and the Illini met sporadically. The official first meeting between the two schools occurred on December 21, 1932, where the Tigers hosted the Illini at Brewer Fieldhouse. Illini head coach Craig Ruby, a former star and coach at Mizzou, led his team to victory, 36-24. The following year, the Illini hosted the Tigers at Huff Hall, winning again by 36-24. Over the next half-century, the two teams met nine more times, culminating with a back-and-forth series called the Show-Me Classic.  This event began in December 1976 in Columbia, Missouri, at the Hearnes Center, where Missouri defeated Illinois, 76-75.  Over the next three years (1977–79) the two teams reciprocated home courts.

This series was replaced by the Braggin' Rights series on a neutral court sponsored by Anheuser-Busch for the 1980-81 season.

Other Mizzou and Illini teams now play Braggin' Rights games, most notably football.

Due to the Coronavirus Pandemic, the 2020 Braggin' Rights game was not held at the Enterprise Center, but rather at the home stadium of Missouri. A coin flip, performed by Andy Katz, took place on November 12, 2020 and it was determined that Missouri would be the host for the December 12, 2020 game.

Accomplishments by the two rivals
The following summarizes the accomplishments of the two programs.

Through March 18, 2023

Game results

Games with both teams ranked
(Rankings are from AP Poll)

Winning team is shown. Ranking of the team at the time of the game by the AP poll is shown under the team name.

Series results
Winning team is shown. Ranking of the team at the time of the game by the AP poll is shown by the team name.
Rankings are from the AP Poll (1936–present)

Series statistics 
 Series Record:  Illinois leads 33 to 20
 Current Streak: Missouri, 1 win
 Illinois when ranked: 13-8
 Missouri when ranked: 6-10
 When both teams are ranked: Illinois leads 6-3
 Illinois when unranked: 11-6
 Missouri when unranked: 8-14
 When both teams are unranked: Illinois leads 10-3
 In overtime games: Tied 2-2
 At Brewer Fieldhouse: Tied 2-2
 At Huff Hall: Illinois led 3-0
 At Hearnes Center: Tied 1-1
 At Assembly Hall: Tied 1-1
 At St. Louis Arena: Illinois led 9-4
 At Enterprise Center: Illinois leads 17-11
 At Mizzou Arena: Missouri leads 1-0
 Illinois' longest winning streak: 9 (2000–08)
 Missouri's longest winning streak: 4 (1991–94, 2009–12)
 Illinois' largest winning margin: 32 points (2005)
 Missouri's largest winning margin: 22 points (2022)
 Closest margin: 1 point, four times in regulation (1992, 2003, 2007, 2013) and once in three overtimes (1993)

See also
 Illinois–Missouri football rivalry

References

College basketball rivalries in the United States
Illinois Fighting Illini men's basketball
Missouri Tigers men's basketball
Recurring sporting events established in 1980
Sports in St. Louis
1980 establishments in Missouri